Growth management, in the United States, is a set of techniques used by the government to ensure that as the population grows that there are services available to meet their demands. Growth management goes beyond traditional land use planning, zoning and subdivision controls in both the characteristics of development influenced and the scope of government powers used.  These are not necessarily only government services. Other demands such as the protection of natural spaces, sufficient and affordable housing, delivery of utilities, preservation of buildings and places of historical value, and sufficient places for the conduct of business are also considered.

Types of growth management

There are a wide variety of tools or techniques used by local governments to reduce development or to shift it to other places.  A major technique is the application of zoning to reduce the cost of service delivery.  Zoning can be used to reduce the area affected by urbanization, allowing the same number of people to live and work in a smaller area, allowing governmental services to be delivered more efficiently.  For example, fire protection and emergency medical response services are less expensive to provide in compact areas than in areas where the population is more spread out.  This results in lower expenditures for the same level of service, which saves taxpayer dollars.  The efficiencies gained can also result in benefits to the private sector.  For example, grocery stores and pizza delivery businesses can serve only a limited area.  If more customers are located within their service delivery area, the cost of delivering their services is decreased.

Undeveloped land at the periphery of urban areas is often the target of growth management efforts since its future use is yet to be determined.  That land can be targeted for agricultural use or low density residential development.

Reducing the allowable density of development (downzoning) was a tool adopted by suburban jurisdictions in California in the 1970s to attempt to prevent intense development in the future.  The problem with such approaches is that they lead to lawsuits as owners of that land perceive the downzoning as a taking of their rights without compensation. Changing zoning rules to allow fewer future developments almost always leads to suits by owners.

Reducing floor-area ratios in urban areas is another tool aimed at reducing future development levels.  The ratios are the amount of built space relative to the parcel area with lower ratios obviously implying fewer stories and units.

Imposing impact fees is another tool that is used to shape development in that a charge is leveled on owners of newly developed properties for the "impact" the new development will have on the community.  Fees can be used for such things as transportation improvements, new parks, and expansion of schools.  Impact fees are not used to maintain existing facilities, but instead, are used to create new facilities in proportion to the number of new developments in the area.

Preventing suburban densities from affecting a large area also has the effect of providing open spaces so that people who wish to live in a rural setting can do so without urbanization threatening their lifestyle.

California studies

Jurisdictions throughout the United States have experimented with local growth management measures designed to limit the growth of residential or commercial development within their jurisdiction or to shift them to areas with less development.  Glickfeld and Levine conducted two major studies of growth management measures in virtually all California cities and counties in 1988 and 1992. The first study inquired about 18 different types of growth management measures. The vast majority of the jurisdictions had adopted one or more growth management measures to affect residential, commercial or new development.  These varied from requiring adequate service levels as a condition for receiving approval to construct residential or commercial developments to measures that reduced permitted residential density to measures that restricted the height of buildings or the floor area ratio on a given parcel.  Typically, jurisdictions near the Pacific coastline had more restrictions than those in the interior of the state.

The second study showed that over the four-year period between the two surveys the cumulative effect of growth-management legislation showed no relationship to permitted construction values for California as a whole when controlling for population growth and interest rates.

However, a follow-up study showed that the measures helped displace new construction from the metropolitan areas to the interiors of the state with low income and minority populations being particularly impacted.  That is, the measures did not affect overall construction levels in California but did affect where new construction was built.

Comprehensive planning

The application of growth management techniques is often governed by the development of a comprehensive plan.  The plan can be used to measure the impact that new growth will have on the community and define the method by which that impact is mitigated. Several states have adopted state measures to govern local growth management ordinances. Pioneers in statewide United States growth management were Oregon, which established Urban Growth Boundaries in the 1970s and Florida which passed the Growth Management Act in 1985.

See also 
 Adequate Public Facilities Ordinance
 Impact fee
 Smart growth

References

External links 
Growth Management Institute
The City Program, offering courses and free public lectures on urban planning from Simon Fraser University.

Urban planning
Urban planning in the United States